The Old Tai Po Police Station is a former Hong Kong police station at the top of Tai Po Wan Tau Tong Hill. It is located at No. 11 Wan Tau Kok Lane, Tai Po, New Territories, Hong Kong, near the Old District Office North.

History
The Old Tai Po Police Station was built in 1899, shortly after the British leased the New Territories in 1898. It was the first police station and police headquarters in the New Territories. It is said to have been built at the site of the British flag raising ceremony which marked the official British takeover of the New Territories. It operated as a police station until the new district police station of Tai Po started its service in 1987.

Conservation
The Old Tai Po Police Station was listed as a Grade II historic building from 1988 to 2021. In 2008, it was part of the seven buildings of Batch I of the Hong Kong Government's Revitalising Historic Buildings Through Partnership Scheme seeking adaptive reuse of government-owned historic buildings. The project was awarded by UNESCO Asia Pacific Heritage Awards in 2016 with honourable mention. The Old Tai Po Police Station was declared a monument on 16 July 2021.

See also
 Revitalising Historic Buildings Through Partnership Scheme
 Historic police station buildings in Hong Kong

References

Further reading

Tai Po
Declared monuments of Hong Kong
Tai Po
Defunct police stations
Government buildings completed in 1899
1899 establishments in Hong Kong